Orthochromis luongoensis is a species of cichlid endemic to Zambia, where it is only known from the Luongo River, a tributary of the Luapula in the upper Congo River basin.  This species can reach a length of  SL.

References

External links 

luongoensis
Cichlid fish of Africa
Fish of Zambia
Fish described in 1994